"Exposed" is the second episode aired of the first series of UFO - a 1970 British television science fiction series about an alien invasion of Earth. The screenplay was written Tony Barwick and the director was David Lane. The episode was filmed between 13 May and 23 May 1969 and aired on the ATV Midlands network on 23 September 1970. Though shown as the second episode, it was actually the fifth to have been filmed.

The episode introduces Colonel Paul Foster (Michael Billington), who was to become a regular character for the rest of the series.

The series was created by Gerry Anderson and Sylvia Anderson with Reg Hill, and produced by the Andersons and Lew Grade's Century 21 Productions for Grade's ITC Entertainment company.

Story
When the Sky One interceptor aircraft intercepts and destroys a UFO, the explosion causes the nearby experimental test aircraft XV-104, whose pilot refused the order to leave the area, to crash. While the co-pilot Jim is killed, the pilot Paul Foster (Michael Billington) survives, temporarily blinded.

After waking in hospital and regaining his sight, Foster claims that the cause of the aircraft crash was a UFO but his superior at his employer Ventura Aircraft and an RAF investigator, Dr. Douglas Jackson (Vladek Sheybal), do not believe him as evidence, showing Sky One but no UFOs, points to pilot error. Believing that a cover-up is taking place, Foster undertakes his own investigation into the events surrounding the crash. He is aided by the sister (Jean Marsh) of the dead co-pilot.

Foster's investigation leads him to Commander Edward Straker (Ed Bishop). Straker agrees to meet Foster at the Harlington-Straker Studios that are used as a cover for the secret SHADO Control base located beneath. Straker is in fact testing Foster to see if he is capable of joining SHADO. Foster passes the induction and Straker reveals all about the UFO threat that Earth faces, also revealing that both Jackson and Jim's sister are actually SHADO operatives.

Cast

Starring
 Ed Bishop — Commander Edward Straker
 George Sewell — Col. Alec E. Freeman
 Michael Billington — Col. Paul Foster
 Gabrielle Drake — Lt. Gay Ellis
 Wanda Ventham — Col. Virginia Lake
 Peter Gordeno — Capt. Peter Carlin
 Dolores Mantez — Lt. Nina Barry
 Gary Myers — Capt. Lew Waterman
 Keith Alexander — Lt. Keith Ford
 Ayshea — Lt. Ayshea Johnson
 Vladek Sheybal — Dr. Douglas Jackson
 Norma Ronald — Miss Ealand

Also Starring
 Jean Marsh — Janna Wade

Featuring
 Basil Moss — Dr. Frazer	
 Robin Bailey — William Kofax	
 Paula Li Schiu — Tsi Chan 
 Arthur Cox — Louis Graham	
 Matt Zimmerman — Jim - test aircraft co-pilot
 Sue Gerrard — Nurse

Music
An original score was composed for this episode by Barry Gray.

Production notes
Actor Basil Moss is one of 11 actors to have appeared in the TV series and the 1969 movie Doppelgänger.

Locations used for the filming included MGM-British Studios and Neptune House at ATV Elstree Studios, both in Borehamwood.

References

External links
 Screenplay for the episode

1970 British television episodes
UFO (TV series) episodes